Irena Kwiatkowska (17 September 19123 March 2011) was a popular Polish actress, known in Poland for her many cabaret roles and monologues, as well as appearances in (mostly comedy) movies and television shows.

Life
Kwiatkowska graduated from the Państwowy Instytut Sztuki Teatralnej (National Theatrical Arts Institute) in 1935. Until the outbreak of World War II, she appeared in the Teatr Powszechny in Warsaw, Teatr Nowy in Poznań, Teatr Polski in Katowice, and in Wilno. During the War, she fought in the Armia Krajowa and participated in the Warsaw Uprising.

Kwiatkowska's first appearance after the War was in the Siedem Kotów (Seven Cats) cabaret in Kraków, where the renowned Polish poet, Konstanty Ildefons Gałczyński, authored a number of roles for her. Gałczyński allegedly created the prominent character of Hermenegilda Kociubińska with Kwiatkowska in mind. In 1948 she came back to Warsaw, appearing in the Teatr Syrena and, now-legendary, Dudek and Szpak cabarets. She was also a prominent member of the cast in the famous televised Kabaret Starszych Panów.

Kwiatkowska's other famous television roles included the cult series, Wojna Domowa ("Civil War", 1965–66) and Czterdziestolatek ("Being Forty", 1974–77). In the Czterdziestolatek series, she portrayed the memorable "Kobieta Pracująca" ("Working Woman"), a recurring character who performs various unusual or absurd jobs. She is best remembered for this role, and the character's name has become synonymous with Kwiatkowska. She reprised the role in the series sequel, Czterdziestolatek 20 lat później (1993). She also appeared in many theatrical movies, mostly in comedies and musicals, including memorable cameos in later years. Her résumé included frequent voice acting on the radio.

During her lifetime Kwiatkowska received numerous awards, including the Wielki Splendor Polish Radio Theatre Award (1993) and the Superwiktor (2002), a special lifetime achievement award for outstanding television personalities. Her 90th birthday celebration in 2002 was a major cultural event which attracted a varied array of artists on stage during a special televised show. She performed with the Teatr Polski in Warsaw, where she continued to appear in an interpretation of Gałczyński's Zielona Gęś. She appeared in Niarnia in 2009. She died in Skolimów on 3 March 2011.

Filmography

See also
List of Poles

Notes

External links 
 
 

1912 births
2011 deaths
Actresses from Warsaw
Polish film actresses
Polish stage actresses
Polish television actresses
Recipients of the Order of Polonia Restituta (1944–1989)
Recipients of the Order of the Banner of Work
Polish cabaret performers
20th-century Polish actresses
Polish radio personalities
Polish voice actresses
Polish actresses
Recipients of the State Award Badge (Poland)